Twinkle Twinkle may refer to:

 My Heart Twinkle Twinkle, a 2015 South Korean television series
 Twinkle, Twinkle, Little Star, a popular English lullaby
 Twinkle, Twinkle, Little Star (Pinkney book)
 Twinkle, Twinkle, Little Bat, an Alice's Adventures in Wonderland song based on Twinkle, Twinkle, Little Star
 Twinkle Twinkle (TV series), a South Korean television series
 "Twinkle Twinkle" (Secret song), a 2012 song by Welcome to SECRET time
 Twinkle, Twinkle Lucky Star, a 1987 song by Merle Haggard